Duncan MacGregor was a Scottish rugby union player.

He also played for Pontypridd RFC in Wales.

He was the brother of John MacGregor who was also capped for Scotland.

References
 Bath, Richard (ed.) The Scotland Rugby Miscellany (Vision Sports Publishing Ltd, 2007 )

Pontypridd RFC players
Scottish rugby union players
Scotland international rugby union players